Iloilo's 5th congressional district is one of the five congressional districts of the Philippines in the province of Iloilo. It has been represented in the House of Representatives of the Philippines since 1916 and earlier in the Philippine Assembly from 1907 to 1916. The district consists of the northern municipalities of Ajuy, Balasan, Barotac Viejo, Batad, Carles, Concepcion, Estancia, Lemery, San Dionisio, San Rafael and Sara. It is currently represented in the 18th Congress by Raul C. Tupas of the Nacionalista Party (NP).

Representation history

Election results

2016

≥u

2013

2010

See also
Legislative districts of Iloilo

References

Congressional districts of the Philippines
Politics of Iloilo
1907 establishments in the Philippines
Congressional districts of Western Visayas
Constituencies established in 1907